The 2022–23 season is the 111th season in the existence of Swansea City Association Football Club and the club's fifth consecutive season in the Championship. In addition to the league, they will also compete in the 2022–23 FA Cup and they competed in the 2022–23 EFL Cup.

Transfers

In

Out

Loans in

Loans out

Pre-season and friendlies
On 13 May 2022, newly promoted EFL League One side Bristol Rovers revealed that a behind closed doors friendly away to Swansea was scheduled for 16 July. Swansea City then announced two pre-season friendlies against Plymouth Argyle and Charlton Athletic on 31 May.

Competitions

Overall record

Championship

League table

Results summary

Results by round

Matches

On 23 June, the league fixtures were announced.

FA Cup

The Swans were drawn away to Bristol City in the third round.

EFL Cup

The Swans were drawn away to Oxford United in the first round.

Squad statistics

Players with names in italics and marked * were on loan from another club for the whole of their season with Swansea City.

|-
!colspan=15|Players out on loan:

|}

References

Swansea City
Swansea City A.F.C. seasons
Welsh football clubs 2022–23 season
English football clubs 2022–23 season